Scenes from Provincial Life may refer to:

 Boyhood: Scenes from Provincial Life, 1997 fictionalised autobiographical work by J. M. Coetzee
Scenes from Provincial Life (series), books by Hugh Walpole
Scenes from Provincial Life, a pair of 19th-century novels in La Comédie humaine by Honoré de Balzac
Scenes from Provincial Life, a 1950 novel by William Cooper
Scenes from Provincial Life, a 1991 book by Joan Givner